RADM Edward Cobb Outlaw (September 29, 1914 – March 5, 1996) was a naval aviator, flying ace, ship's captain and fleet commander of the United States Navy. Outlaw first served as commanding officer of Fighting Squadron 32 (VF-32) aboard the light carrier  during World War II. He was awarded the Navy Cross for a mission with this squadron in which he shot down five Japanese planes, making him an ace in a day.

Outlaw served in command positions during the Vietnam War including task group and task force commander, carrier division commander, and finally a joint post as NATO's commander of Maritime Air Forces Mediterranean and the Navy's Commander Anti-Submarine Warfare for the Sixth Fleet.

Early life

Outlaw was born to Mr. and Mrs. Needham Whitfield Outlaw on September 29, 1914, in Greenville, North Carolina. After high school, Outlaw received appointment to the United States Naval Academy, where he participated in track. He graduated in 1935 as the youngest member of his class.

He was then ordered to flight training school and in 1938 was designated naval aviator. Before the United States entered World War II, he served first as a member of  Scouting Squadron 6 (VS-6) and then as chief flight officer at Naval Air Station Corpus Christi.

World War II
In March 1942, just a few months after the attack on Pearl Harbor, Outlaw was made executive officer of Escort Scouting Squadron 11 (VGS-11). After its initial training period, the squadron reported aboard  on November 2, 1942. For the month of December the squadron provided air cover and anti-submarine patrol in the vicinity of Nouméa. All throughout January and February 1943, VGS-11 operated as a land-based unit. Most of their time was spent on Guadalcanal in the closing weeks of the Guadalcanal Campaign.

Outlaw was next appointed commanding officer (CO) of newly commissioned Fighting Squadron 32 (VF-32) on June 1, 1943.  The squadron reported aboard the similarly newly commissioned light carrier  on October 21, 1943. After giving the carrier its shakedown cruise and completing its final phase of training, the squadron met Langley at sea on January 19, 1944, and ten days later began its combat cruise.

VF-32 executed pre-invasion strikes against the Japanese-held Marshall Islands in early February and continued to provide air support for American invasion forces throughout the month. At the end of March, VF-32 quickly struck out at the Palau Islands. In April Langley moved on to participate in the New Guinea campaign, where VF-32 provided strikes and air support for landings at Hollandia.

The squadron participated in strikes against Chuuk Lagoon in the Caroline Islands between April 29 – 30. On the first of these days, Outlaw led a fighter sweep consisting of 8 Langley planes intended to meet up with other fighter aircraft for attacks on military installations. VF-32 arrived at the target site before any of the other squadrons and immediately engaged 35 – 40 Mitsubishi A6M Zero fighter planes in aerial combat. Despite these odds, VF-32 shot down 21 enemy aircraft without suffering a single loss. Outlaw himself was credited with 5 kills and a probable on this sortie, making him an ace-in-a-day.

On May 12, 1944, while Langley was at anchor in Majuro between strike action, Outlaw was promoted to Commander Air Group 32 (CAG-32). The air group resumed its flight schedule on June 6 as part of the opening air strikes of the Mariana campaign. During the initial fighter sweep that day, CAG Outlaw downed an enemy Zero, bringing his score to six. The air group served as Combat Air Patrol (CAP) or Anti-Submarine Patrol (ASP) over their task group for much of June, though strikes were flown against targets on Saipan, Rota and Pagan.  While at Eniwetok re-provisioning and rearming for the upcoming assault on Guam, Outlaw received a rank promotion to Commander. Air Group 32 carried out strikes on Guam from July 18 to August 7. On August 24, 1944, Commander Outlaw was relieved of command.

Outlaw's final wartime posts were as Staff Operations Officer to Task Groups 38.2/58.2 until March 1945, Executive Officer of NAS Corpus Christi up through July 1945, and finally as training officer on the staff of the Chief of Naval Air Basic Training at Naval Air Station Pensacola, a position he held until December 1946.

Post-WWII
 was commissioned October 1, 1947, and Outlaw was put in command of the carrier's first air group, Battle Carrier Air Group 5. His next major post was as Operations Officer—and then briefly as Commanding Officer—of Composite Squadron VC-5. This was the first US Navy air unit used to test carrier-capable, nuclear armed aircraft. Continuing in this vein, Outlaw participated in the Armed Forces Special Weapons Project as Chief of Operations and Training.

After a tour as Executive Officer aboard  in 1953, Outlaw moved through a number of staff positions related to his early experience with nuclear arms. In 1959 he captained . The last position Outlaw filled before his involvement with the Vietnam War was as Commander of the US Naval Aviation Safety Center. In this capacity he published papers concerning aircraft accidents and the reliability of contractor-built products.

Vietnam War
Edward Outlaw, now a rear admiral, became Commander Carrier Division 1 on July 1, 1964. From his flagship USS Coral Sea, Outlaw's Task Force 77 participated in the first carrier strikes against North Vietnamese forces. Over the course of their first two months of strikes beginning February 7, 1965, the task force's three carriers hit five target areas in the face of intense ground fire.

Cold War
October 29, 1965, Outlaw assumed command of Hunter-Killer Force Atlantic Fleet and Carrier Division 16. Aboard his flagship , Outlaw was responsible for anti-submarine warfare operations, which at this time meant protecting the fleet from approximately 400 Russian submarines. He continued in this specialty when in May 1968 he was appointed Commander Anti-Submarine Warfare Forces Sixth Fleet; and later in the year when he received a joint position as NATO's Commander Maritime Air Forces Mediterranean, a role intended to better track Soviet ship activity.

Awards and decorations

References
Citations

Bibliography

 
 

Military documents
 
 
 
 
 

Online sources
 
 
 
  
 
  
  
  
 
  
 
  
 

United States Navy pilots of World War II
United States Navy admirals
People from Greenville, North Carolina
United States Naval Academy alumni
Recipients of the Navy Cross (United States)
1914 births
1996 deaths
American World War II flying aces
United States Navy personnel of the Vietnam War